Mary Ann Moorman (born August 5, 1932) is a witness to the assassination of United States President John F. Kennedy. She is best known for her photograph capturing the presidential limousine a fraction of a second after the fatal shot.

The Badge Man, whom conspiracy theorists claim is one of Kennedy's assassins, is purportedly visible in one of her photographs.

Biography
Mary Ann Moorman was born Mary Ann Boshart. She married Donald G. Moorman in 1952 and divorced him in 1973. She later married Gary Krahmer in 1980.

Assassination witness

On November 22, 1963, U.S. President John F. Kennedy was assassinated in Dallas, Texas.

Moorman stated that her 11-year-old son had wanted to see Kennedy, but was unable to attend because of school. She said she promised to take a picture for him.

Moorman stated that she stepped off the grass onto the street to take a photo with her Polaroid camera. Zapruder can be seen standing on the pergola in the Moorman photograph, with the presidential limousine already having passed through the line of sight between Zapruder and Moorman.

Both Moorman and her friend, Jean Hill, can be clearly seen in the Zapruder film. Between Zapruder frames 315 and 316, Moorman took a Polaroid photograph, her fifth that day, showing the presidential limousine with the grassy knoll area in the background.

Moorman's photograph captured the fatal head shot that killed President Kennedy. Moorman said in a TV interview that  immediately after the assassination, there were three or four shots close together, that shots were still being fired after the fatal head shot, and that she was in the line of fire. She later stated in a 2013 PBS documentary Kennedy Half Century that she was close enough to hear Jackie Kennedy exclaim that John had been shot.

In 2013, Moorman attempted to sell the original polaroid through Cowan's Auctions in Cincinnati. The photo was expected to sell for between $50,000 and $75,000, but did not meet its reserve. It ultimately sold there. She had previously tried selling the photo to Sotheby's in New York, but the auction house deemed it to be "too sensitive to auction". That same year, she expressed her opinion on the assassination; she was convinced that Kennedy was killed as a result of a conspiracy. "I really don’t know what exactly happened, but I do know there is bound to be a lot more to the story that hasn't been told," she said. "I was hoping it would come out in my lifetime, but who knows. So much has been hidden by the government; anything can take place and it can be hidden. Oswald probably wasn't a lone person, he probably had backers. I really do think it was a conspiracy".

Controversy

Whatever was captured in the background of Moorman's photo has been a matter of contentious debate. On the grassy knoll, some have claimed to identify as many as four different human figures, while others dismiss these indistinct images as either trees or shadows. Most often, one figure has been dubbed the "Badge Man" as it seems to resemble a uniformed police officer wearing a badge. Others claim to see Gordon Arnold, a man who claimed to have filmed the assassination from that area, a man in a construction hard hat, and a hatted man behind the stockade fence.

Moorman stated she heard a shot as the limousine passed her, then heard another two shots, "pow pow," when the president's head exploded. She stated that she could not determine where the shots came from, and that she saw no one in the area that appeared to have possibly been the assassin. Moorman was interviewed by the Dallas County Sheriff's Department and the FBI. She was called by the Warren Commission to testify, but due to a sprained ankle, she was unable to be questioned. She was never contacted by them again.

References

External links
 Dallas Sheriff's Dept. Affidavit of Mary Ann Moorman, November 22, 1963.
 Testimony of Mary Ann Moorman in the Clay Shaw trial, 1969.
 The five Moorman photographs.
 JFK Online: Badge Man and the Mary Moorman Polaroid.
 Dealey Plaza eyewitness: Mary Moorman, interview posted September 12, 2016.

1932 births
Living people
Witnesses to the assassination of John F. Kennedy